Damian Hugo Philipp von Schönborn (19 September 1676 in Mainz – 19 August 1743 in Bruchsal) was  Prince-Bishop of Speyer (1719–1743), Bishop of Konstanz (1740–1743) and a cardinal (1713). He participated in  papal conclaves in 1721, 1724 and 1730.

External links
The Cardinals of the Holy Roman Church

Damian Hugo Philipp
Teutonic Knights
18th-century German cardinals
1676 births
1743 deaths